Donald Tyson Ewell (November 14, 1916 – August 9, 1983) was an American jazz stride pianist. He worked with Sidney Bechet, Kid Ory, George Lewis, George Brunis, Muggsy Spanier, and Bunk Johnson.

Biography
Born in Baltimore, Maryland, Ewell played with Bill Reinhardt's Jazz, Ltd. band in Chicago in 1947, 1948, and 1949. 

From 1956 to 1962, Ewell was a member of the Jack Teagarden band. After Teagarden died, Ewell toured Europe, then returned to New Orleans and performed in clubs and hotels. From 1976 to 1978, he concertized and suffered from alcoholism while living with his friend King Denton, the manager of a jazz club where Ewell was Artist-in-residence. 

Ewell moved back to his native Maryland. After his daughter's death from cancer and after suffering two strokes, Ewell died on August 9, 1983, aged 66, in Pompano Beach, Florida.

Discography

As leader
 Mama Yancey Singer/Don Ewell Pianist (Windin' Ball, 1955)
 Music to Listen to Don Ewell By (Good Time Jazz, 1957)
 Man Here Plays Fine Piano! (Good Time Jazz, 1961)
 Free 'n' Easy! (Good Time Jazz, 1962)
 Denver Concert (Pumpkin, 1966; reissued by Storyville) – with Barbara Dane
 Grand Piano with Willie The Lion Smith (Swaggie, 1966)
 A Jazz Portrait of the Artist (Chiaroscuro, 1969)
 Don Ewell and Bob Greene...Together (Jazzology, 1970)
 Duet! with Bob Greene (Fat Cat's Jazz, 1970)
 Live at the 100 Club (77 Records, 1971)
 Take It in Stride (Chiaroscuro, 1971)
 Don Ewell (Chiaroscuro, 1974)
 Don Ewell Trio and Quartet (Center, 1976)
 New Orleans Rascals and Don Ewell (Philips, 1976)
 In New Orleans with Herb Hall (New Orleans, 1980)
 Don Ewell and His All-Stars (Jazzology, 1981)
 Don Ewell Quintet (Jazzology, 1982)
 Chicago '57  (Stomp Off, 1984)
 Jazz on a Sunday Afternoon (Storyville, 1969)
 Memories of You with Claire Austin (Audiophile, 1993)
 Don Ewell Meets Pamela and Llew Hird with the Sydney Stompers (G.H.B., 1995)
 Stride Piano Duets Live in Toronto 1966 with Willie The Lion Smith (Delmark, 2008)

As sideman
With Barbara Dane
 Trouble in Mind (San Francisco)

With Doc Evans
 Jazz Ltd. Volume 1 (Delmark)
 Doc Evans Dixieland Band (Atlantic)

With Bunk Johnson
 Bunk Johnson with the Yerba Buena Jazz Band 1944 and with Doc Evans & His Band (Document)
 Bunk Johnson Plays Popular Songs (American Music)

With Jack Teagarden
Mis'ry and the Blues (Verve, 1961)

References

Stride pianists
Jazz musicians from New Orleans
American jazz pianists
American male pianists
1916 births
1983 deaths
20th-century American pianists
20th-century American male musicians
American male jazz musicians
Sackville Records artists
Chiaroscuro Records artists
Good Time Jazz Records artists